Salma Celeste Paralluelo Ayingono (born 13 November 2003) is a Spanish professional footballer and former sprinter who plays as a left winger for Liga F club FC Barcelona and the Spain women's national team.

Early life
Paralluelo was born in Zaragoza to a Spanish father and an Equatorial Guinean Fang mother.

Club career
Paralluelo is a UD San José product. She has played for Zaragoza CFF and Villarreal in Spain. 2022 FIFA Puskás Award nominee.

International career
Paralluelo is eligible to play for Spain or Equatorial Guinea. Representing the former, she won the 2018 UEFA Women's Under-17 Championship, the 2018 FIFA U-17 Women's World Cup and the 2022 FIFA U-20 Women's World Cup, and made her senior debut on 11 November 2022, starting and scoring a hat-trick in a 7-0 friendly home win over Argentina.

International goals

Athletics
As an athlete, Paralluelo began her career at the San José Athletics club in Zaragoza and shortly after joined the Scorpio-71 club in Zaragoza. In late 2019 she went to Playas de Castellón. She won her first medal at the 2019 Spanish Indoor Athletics Championships, winning bronze in the 400-meter test with a mark of 53.83s, a Spanish national record in the sub-18 and sub-20 categories. Her result also allowed her to participate in the 2019 European Athletics Indoor Championships, being the second youngest athlete in history to do so, after the Norwegian walker Kjersti Tysse.

In the outdoor season, in the third race of her entire life over the 400 meter hurdles, during the Ibero-American Athletics Meeting in Huelva, Paralluelo ran a time of 57.43, beating the all-time best Spanish sub-18 record and also breaking that years sub-18 world best time. With this result she was also qualified for the 2019 European Youth Summer Olympic Festival, where she won two gold medals in the 400m hurdles event with a time of 57.95.

References

External links
 Salma Paralluelo at FC Barcelona
 Salma Paralluelo at BDFutbol
 
 
 
 

2003 births
Living people
Footballers from Zaragoza
Spanish women's footballers
Women's association football wingers
Zaragoza CFF players
Villarreal CF (women) players
FC Barcelona Femení players
Segunda Federación (women) players
Primera División (women) players
Spain women's youth international footballers
Spain women's international footballers
Spanish female sprinters
Spanish sportspeople of Equatoguinean descent
21st-century Spanish women